Juan Carlos Romero Hicks (Guanajuato, Guanajuato; December 10, 1955) is a Mexican politician and elected official, member of the National Action Party, and a Federal Senator since August 29, 2012. He was the Director General of the Mexican National Science and Technology Council (CONACyT) from 2006 to 2011. He served as Governor of Guanajuato from 2000 to 2006. From 1991 to 1999 he served as Chancellor of the University of Guanajuato.

Education
Romero holds a Bachelor Degree in Industrial Relations from the University of Guanajuato and two master's degrees from Southern Oregon University in Business Administration and Social Sciences. Most of his early professional life was dedicated to academia as a Professor in the University of Guanajuato of which he became a Chancellor from 1991 to 1999 under Governor Carlos Medina Plascencia.

On May 21, 1994, during his term as Chancellor the University of Guanajuato became autonomous. He also participated in an important number of academic organizations and institutions including the Presidency of the Inter-American Organization for Higher Education and the Consortium for North American Higher Education Collaboration.

Political career
He joined the National Action Party in 1999 and in 2000 he became Governor of his native State Guanajuato.

On December 7, 2006 he was appointed by President Felipe Calderon Hinojosa Director General for the Mexican National Science and Technology Council where he served until March, 2011.

Currently he is a Federal Senator for the LXII and LXIII legislative periods where he is President of de Education Commission, Secretary of the Science and Technology Commission and the North American Foreign Affairs Commission, and member of the Foreign Affairs Commission.

Mexico's major Constitutional Reform on Education was passed under his Presidency of the Senate Education Commission in December 2011. He has also been an advocate on behalf of migrants and  their humanitarian assistance.

See also
CONACYT

References
 The Cabinet - Director General of CONACyT - Juan Carlos Romero Hicks. Government of Mexico. Accessed 2011-03-11.

1955 births
Living people
National Action Party (Mexico) politicians
Governors of Guanajuato
Politicians from Guanajuato
People from Guanajuato City
Mexican people of English descent
Southern Oregon University alumni
21st-century Mexican politicians
Members of the Constituent Assembly of Mexico City
Universidad de Guanajuato alumni
Members of the Senate of the Republic (Mexico) for Guanajuato
Senators of the LXII and LXIII Legislatures of Mexico